Florence Morse Kingsley (July 14, 1859November 7, 1937) was an American author of popular and religious fiction.

Early life 
Florence Morse Kingsley was born in Poe, Medina County, Ohio, to artists Eleanor Ecob and Jonathan Bradley Morse. Florence grew up in Brecksville Township, Ohio, where her parents were educators in the local school district.

Personal life 
Florence Morse was a student at Wellesley College from 1876 to 1879. However, she had to leave before graduating because of a severe eye problem. 

She married Reverend Charles Rawson Kingsley, son of Frances Elizabeth Rawson and Charles Clark Kingsley on July 12, 1882 in Utica, New York. Dr. Charles and Mrs Florence Kingsley had five children: Charles Rawson Kingsley, Jr., Donald Morse Kingsley, Grace Ecob Kingsley, James Morse Kingsley, and John Bradley Kingsley.

Professional life 
Florence Morse Kingsley was a contemporary of fellow writer Lew Wallace, the author of Ben-Hur. The influence of her early Wellesley days were captured in her books:
The Hired Baby
And so They were Married
The Wounds of a Friend
The Princess and the Ploughman
To the Highest Bidder
The Singular Miss Smith

When Kingsley was thirty-five, a publisher held a writing competition to obtain the best manuscript that would inspire a child's faith for Christ. It was in this contest that Florence Kingsley submitted her manuscript for Titus: A Comrade of the Cross. In six weeks, 200,000 copies had been printed to meet demand. She later published two other works of Christian fiction: the sequel to her original entitled Stephen: A Soldier of the Cross, and the epic tale The Cross Triumphant.

Kingsley was featured in, and a contributing writer to, the Ladies' Home Journal.

References

External links 
 
 
 
 Books by Florence Morse Kingsley
 Florence Morse Kingsley on the Online Books Page

American Christian writers
Wellesley College alumni
1859 births
1937 deaths
Writers from Ohio
People from Medina County, Ohio
People from Brecksville, Ohio